It's Pronounced Five Two is the third studio album by rapper KJ-52.

Track listing 

 "Welcome to the Five Two's"
 "KJ Five Two"
 "Whoop Whoop"
 "Dear Slim Pt. 2"
 "So in Love With You"
 "Cartoon Network"
 "Rock On" (featuring Rob Beckley of Pillar)
 "Back in the Day"
 "Can I Speak With a Manager? (Interlude)/Ya Bref Stank"
 "47 Pop Stars"
 "Pick Yourself Up" (featuring Donnie)
 "Don't Go"
 "Check Yourself"
 "Infomercial (Interlude)"
 "#1 Fan" (featuring Jubilee)
 "I Feel So Good"
 "I'm Guilty"
 "Outro/Gimme Dat"(Mountain Dew Song)

External links
Official site
Alternate Album Cover

KJ-52 albums
2003 albums